Bells of San Fernando is a 1947 American romantic adventure film directed by Terry O. Morse. Duncan Renaldo co-wrote the screenplay and was an associate producer of the film.

The film is also known as Gold in San Fernando in Austria.

It was released as a second feature.

Plot summary 
During the period of New Spain, the dictatorial Juan Mendoza, overseer of the San Fernando Valley seals the area off and forbids anyone to enter or leave. When he seeks to marry Maria Garcia, daughter of the blacksmith, her Irish boyfriend Michael O'Brien challenges Mendoza.

At the same time a small vein of gold in the area is discovered with the gold concealed inside a church bell.

Michael and Maria seek to escape to Monterey to seek the help of the Governor of Alta California.

Cast 
Donald Woods as Michael "Gringo" O'Brien
Gloria Warren as Maria Garcia
Byron Foulger as Francisco Garcia, Mission Blacksmith
Shirley O'Hara as Nita
Anthony Warde as Juan Mendoza, Overseer
Monte Blue as Governor Don Sebastian Fernando
Paul Newlan as Gueyon, Garcia's Assistant
David Leonard as Father Xavier
Gordon B. Clarke as Henchman Enrico
Frank Cody as Henchman Junipero
Lusita Triana as Spanish Dancer
Felipe Turich as Pablo, the traitor
Claire Du Brey as Manta
Gil Frye as Governor's Secretary
Ray Dolciame as 1st Clerk, Governor's Office
John Parker as 2nd Clerk, Governor's Office

Soundtrack 
 Gloria Warren – "Land of My Dreams" (written by Marian Boyle and Don Roland)
 Donald Woods – "Green Grow the Rushes, O" (Irish folk song)

References

External links 

1947 films
American Western (genre) films
American black-and-white films
1947 Western (genre) films
Films directed by Terry O. Morse
Lippert Pictures films
Films set in California
1947 drama films
1940s English-language films
1940s American films